This is an inclusive list of science fiction television programs whose names begin with the letter L.

L
Live-action
L5: First City in Space (1996, docufiction)
Lab Rats (2012–2016)
Lab Rats: Elite Force (2016)
Land of the Giants (1968–1970)
Land of the Lost (franchise):
Land of the Lost (1974–1976)
Land of the Lost (1991–1992, Land of the Lost remake)
Langoliers, The (1995, miniseries)
Last Dinosaur, The (1977, Japan/US, film)
Last Exile (franchise):
Last Man on Planet Earth, The (1999, film)
Last Train, The (1999, UK)
Lathe of Heaven, The (1979, film)
Lavender Castle (1999–2000, UK, stop-motion eion)
Legacy of the Silver Shadow (2002, Australia)
Legend (1995)
Legend of Death (1965, UK)
Legends of the Superheroes (1979)
Legends of Tomorrow (2016–2022)
Level 9 (2000–2001)
Lexx (1997–2002, Canada/UK/Germany)
Life on Mars (franchise):
Life on Mars (2006–2007, UK)
Life on Mars (2008–2009, US, Life on Mars remake)
Ashes to Ashes (2008–2010, UK, Life on Mars sequel)
Chica de Ayer, La aka Girl from Yesterday, The (2009, Spain, Life on Mars remake)
Lifepod (1993, film)
Logan's Run (1977–1978)
Lost (2004–2010)
Lost Future, The (2010, film)
Lost in Space (franchise)
Lost in Space (1965–1968)
Lost in Space (2018-2021)
Lost Room, The (2006, miniseries)
Lost Saucer, The (1975–1976)
Lost Signs aka Mystère (2007, France, miniseries)
Lost World, The (2001, film)
Lottery, The (2014)
Love War, The (1970, film)
Luna (1983–1984, UK)

Animation
Lampies, The (2001–2002, UK, animated)
Last Exile (2003, Japan, animated)
Last Exile: Fam, the Silver Wing (2011, Japan, animated, Last Exile sequel)
Lazer Tag Academy (1986, animated)
League of Super Evil aka L.O.S.E. (2009–2012, Canada, animated)
Legend of the Galactic Heroes: Die Neue These (2018, Japan, animated)
Legion of Super Heroes (2006–2008, animated)
Lensman: Power of the Lens (1984–1985, Japan, animated)
Lightspeed Electroid Albegas (1983–1984, Japan, animated)
Lilo & Stitch (franchise):
Lilo & Stitch: The Series (2003–2006, animated)
Stitch! (2008–2011, Japan, animated)
Stitch & Ai (2017, China, animated) 
Lloyd in Space (2001–2004, animated)
Loonatics Unleashed (2004–2007, animated)
Lost Universe (1998, Japan, animated)
Love, Death & Robots (2019–present, anthology, animated)

References

Television programs, L